An Urban settlement is a concentrated settlement that is part of an urban area.  It is an area with high density of human-created structures.

Municipal urban settlement, a type of subdivision such as Cape town in Western Cape
Urban settlement, an official designation for a certain type of urban locality used in some of the republics of Africa such as Southern Africa.
Municipal urban settlement, a type of municipal formation in Russia
, a synonym for urban localities in Russia
Urban-type settlement, an official designation for a certain type of urban locality used in some of the former republics of the Soviet Union
It consists of various towns:-
Administrative town 
Defence town 
Cultural town 
Industrial town 
Junction town

References

Populated places by type

please note :that we do not cite any sources in this research .